Kotogawa Dam is a gravity dam located in Yamanashi Prefecture in Japan. The dam is used for flood control, water supply and power production. The catchment area of the dam is 10 km2. The dam impounds about 30  ha of land when full and can store 5150 thousand cubic meters of water. The construction of the dam was started on 1985 and completed in 2007.

References

Dams in Yamanashi Prefecture
2007 establishments in Japan